Hugh's Room is a restaurant and live music venue in Toronto, Ontario. It is located on Dundas Street West in the city's Roncesvalles neighbourhood.

The club was opened in 2001 by Richard Carson and named in memory of his brother Hugh, a former folk musician who had dreamed of opening his own performance venue before his death of cancer in 1999.

Primarily a folk music club, Hugh's Room also sometimes booked jazz, blues, classical and comedy artists as well. Noted artists who have performed at the club include Pete Seeger, Serena Ryder, Sylvia Tyson, Odetta, Jane Siberry, Ron Sexsmith, Maria Muldaur and Richie Havens. Odetta's performance at the venue, on October 25, 2008, was her last live performance before her death on December 2 that year.

On January 8, 2017, Hugh's Room closed its doors for financial reasons. Several days later, a community committee announced plans to restructure the venue's accumulated debt and reopen. The club reopened in April 2017, following a successful fundraising initiative and the formation of a non-profit committee to manage the venue. The new corporation is called Hugh's Room Live.

In 2020, the Hugh's Room management announced that it was looking for a new building as it could not secure an affordable lease at its current site.

References

External links
 Hugh's Room

Music venues in Toronto
Restaurants in Toronto
Nightclubs in Toronto
Blues venues
Folk music venues
2001 establishments in Ontario